The National Archives of Togo are located in Lomé, Togo. As of 2009 Maboulah Wenmi-Agore Coulibaley served as director of the Bibliothèque et des Archives Nationales du Togo.

See also 
 National Library of Togo
 List of national archives

References

Bibliography
 

Togo
Togolese culture
Archives in Togo
History of Togo